A Dictionary of American English on Historical Principles (DAE) is a dictionary of terms appearing in English in the United States that was published in four volumes from 1938 to 1944 by the University of Chicago Press.  Intended to pick up where the Oxford English Dictionary left off, it covers American English words and phrases in use from the first English settlements up to the start of the 20th century.

History
The work was begun in 1925 by William A. Craigie. The first volume appeared in 1936 under the editorship of Craigie and James R. Hulbert, a professor of English at the University of Chicago. The four volume edition was completed with the help of George Watson and Allen Walker Read. The group referenced early literature depicting American regional accents, including three novels from the 1820s and 1830s by John Neal.

The work was one of the sources for the Dictionary of Americanisms, c. 1952, prepared under the direction of Mitford Mathews.  A similar, but unrelated modern work, the Dictionary of American Regional English, has been compiled to show dialect variation.

Volumes
I. A – Corn patch.  	 	
II. Corn pit – Honk. 		
III. Honk – Record. 		
IV. Recorder – Zu-zu, Bibliography (p. 2529-2552)

Notes

English dictionaries
American literature
Works about American English
1938 non-fiction books
University of Chicago Press books